Benassi may refer to:

Italian dance music
Benassi Bros., dance music group of Benny Benassi and Alle Benassi
Benny Benassi, a DJ/producer of electronic music, best known for his song "Satisfaction".
Alle Benassi, works with Benny Benassi in studio under aliases Benassi Bros., The Biz, and Bat67

Italian footballers
Maikol Benassi, born 1989
Marco Benassi, born 1994
Massimiliano Benassi, born 1981

Italian-language surnames